Brothers in Arms is the fifth studio album by British rock band Dire Straits, released on 17 May 1985 through Vertigo Records internationally and through Warner Bros. Records in the United States. It spent a total of 14 non-consecutive weeks at number one on the UK Albums Chart (including ten consecutive weeks between 18 January and 22 March 1986), nine weeks at number one on the Billboard 200 in the United States and 34 weeks at number one on the Australian Albums Chart. Brothers in Arms was the first album certified ten-times platinum in the UK and is the eighth-best-selling album in UK chart history. It is certified nine-times platinum in the United States and is one of the world's best-selling albums, having sold more than 30 million copies worldwide.

The album won a Grammy Award in 1986 for Best Engineered Album, Non-Classical and Best British Album at the 1987 Brit Awards; the 20th Anniversary reissue won another Grammy in 2006 for Best Surround Sound Album. Q magazine ranked Brothers in Arms number 51 on its list of the 100 Greatest British Albums Ever.

Recording

Brothers in Arms was recorded from October 1984 to February 1985 at AIR Studios on the island of Montserrat, a British overseas territory in the Caribbean. The album was produced by songwriter Mark Knopfler and Neil Dorfsman, who had engineered Dire Straits' 1982 album Love over Gold and Knopfler's 1983 soundtrack album Local Hero.

Brothers in Arms was one of the first albums recorded on a Sony 24-track digital tape machine. The decision to move to digital recording came from Knopfler's constant striving for better sound quality. "One of the things that I totally respected about him," Dorfsman observed, "was his interest in technology as a means of improving his music. He was always willing to spend on high-quality equipment."

Before arriving at Montserrat, Knopfler had written all the songs and rehearsed them with the band. The studio lineup included Knopfler (guitar), John Illsley (bass), Alan Clark (piano, Hammond B-3 organ and synthesisers) and Guy Fletcher, who was new to the band, playing a synth rig that consisted of a huge new Yamaha DX1, a couple of Roland synthesizers and a Synclavier. Guitarist Hal Lindes left the band early on in the sessions, and was replaced in December 1984 by Jack Sonni, a New York-based guitarist and longstanding friend of Knopfler (although Sonni's contribution to the album was minimal). The group's drummer Terry Williams was present at the start of the sessions, before being temporarily replaced.

The studio itself was small, with a  recording space that offered virtually no isolation. "It was a good-sounding studio," Dorfsman later recalled, "but the main room itself was nothing to write home about. The sound of that studio was the desk," referring to the Neve 8078 board. Knopfler and Dorfsman utilised the limited space to best effect, placing the drum kit in the far left corner, facing the control room, miked with Sennheiser MD 421s on the toms, an Electro-Voice RE20 and AKG D12 on the kick drum, a Shure SM57 and AKG C451 with a 20 dB pad on the snare, 451s for overheads and the hi-hat, and Neumann U87s set back a little to capture "some kind of ambience". They placed the piano in a tight booth in the far right corner of the studio, miked with AKG C414s. The Hammond B3 was placed nearby, with its Leslie speaker crammed into an airlock next to the control room. Illsley's bass amplifier was recorded inside a small vocal booth with a Neumann FET 47 and a DI unit. Knopfler's amplifiers were miked with 57s, 451s, and Neumann U67s. Fletcher's synths were placed in the control room.

During the recording of "Money for Nothing", the signature sound of Knopfler's guitar may have been enhanced by a "happy accident" of microphone placement. Knopfler was using his Gibson Les Paul going through a Laney amplifier. While setting up the guitar amplifier microphones in an effort to get the "ZZ Top sound" that Knopfler sought, guitar tech Ron Eve, who was in the control room, heard the "amazing" sound before Dorfsman was finished arranging the mics. "One mic was pointing down at the floor," Dorfsman remembered, "another was not quite on the speaker, another was somewhere else, and it wasn't how I would want to set things up—it was probably just left from the night before, when I'd been preparing things for the next day and had not really finished the setup." What they heard was exactly what ended up on the record; no additional processing or effects were used during the mix.

According to a Sound on Sound magazine interview with Neil Dorfsman, during the first month of the recording sessions the performance of Terry Williams was considered to be unsuitable for the desired sound of the album. Williams was not fired from the band, but he was released from the recording sessions and temporarily replaced by jazz session drummer Omar Hakim, who re-recorded all the album's drum parts during a two-day stay before leaving for other commitments. Both Hakim and Williams are credited on the album, although Williams' only contribution was the improvised crescendo at the beginning of "Money for Nothing". The remaining tracks all featured Omar Hakim as drummer. In another interview Dorfsman said that Williams' fills and tom-toms were also used in the rest of the song. Dorfsman and Knopfler made the decision to erase Williams' contributions and replace them with those of Hakim; however, all the music videos that were released from the album featured Williams.

Although Andy Kanavan was briefly recruited as Dire Straits' new drummer, Terry Williams rejoined the band for the promotional concert world tour.

A defective batch of recording tape at AIR Studios resulted in the loss of part or all of three album tracks, leading to follow-up sessions being recorded at the Power Station in New York during early 1985 (including the addition of a Jack Sonni guitar synthesizer part to 'The Man's Too Strong'). During this time, overdubs were recorded with further New York musicians including Michael and Randy Brecker, Mike Mainieri (who'd previously contributed vibraphone to Love Over Gold) and Jimmy Maelen, plus trumpeter Dave Plews and Average White Band saxophonist Malcolm Duncan. When Illsey sprained his wrist in a roller-skating accident, several prominent New York studio bassists were hired to record or re-record several basslines on the record (Tony Levin on 'Why Worry' and Saturday Night Live house band bassist Neil Jason on 'One World').

Composition
Brothers in Arms has been described musically as a pop rock album. The music video for "Money for Nothing" received heavy rotation on MTV, and it was the first to be aired on MTV Europe when the network launched on 1 August 1987. It is one of only two Dire Straits songs on a studio album not to be solely credited to Knopfler (the other being "The Carousel Waltz", which opens Making Movies), with guest vocalist Sting given a co-writing credit due to the melody of the repeated "I want my MTV" (sung by Sting) in the song's fadeout echoing the melody of the Police's "Don't Stand So Close to Me".

"Walk of Life" was a number two hit in the UK Singles Chart in early 1986 and a number seven hit in the US Billboard Hot 100 later that year. The song was nearly left off the album, but was included after the band out-voted producer Neil Dorfsman.

On the second side of the album, three songs ("Ride Across the River", "The Man's Too Strong" and "Brothers in Arms") are lyrically focused on militarism. "Ride Across the River" uses immersive Latin American imagery, accompanied by synthesized pan flute, mariachi trumpet, a reggae-influenced drum part and eerie background noises. "The Man's Too Strong" depicts the character of an ancient soldier (or war criminal) and his fear of showing feelings as a weakness. Written during the 1982 Falklands War, "Brothers in Arms" deals with the senselessness of war. In 2007, the 25th anniversary of the war, Knopfler recorded a new version of the song at Abbey Road Studios to raise funds for British veterans who he said "are still suffering from the effects of that conflict."

Artwork
The guitar featured on the front of the album cover is Mark Knopfler's 1937 14-fret National Style "O" Resonator. The Style "O" line of guitars was introduced in 1930 and discontinued in 1941. The photographer was Deborah Feingold. The back cover features a painting of the same guitar, by German artist Thomas Steyer. A similar image was also used, with a similar colour scheme, for the 1989 album The Booze Brothers by Brewers Droop.

Release
Brothers in Arms was one of the first albums directed at the CD market, and it was a full digital recording (DDD) at a time when most popular music was recorded on analog equipment. It was also released on vinyl (abridged to fit on one LP) and cassette. Producer Neil Dorfsman says the digital multitrack was mixed on an analog board with the resulting two track mix re-digitized via a Prism A/D converter and recorded on a DAT machine.

Brothers in Arms was the first album to sell one million copies in the CD format and to outsell its LP version. A Rykodisc employee subsequently wrote, "[In 1985 we] were fighting to get our CDs manufactured because the entire worldwide manufacturing capacity was overwhelmed by demand for a single rock title (Dire Straits' Brothers in Arms)."

It was remastered and reissued with the rest of the Dire Straits catalogue in 1996 for most of the world outside the United States and on 19 September 2000 in the United States, the remastering for both reissues was done by Bob Ludwig at Gateway Mastering using the Super Bit Mapping process. In 2000, it was released on XRCD2 format, this edition was remastered by Hiromichi Takiguchi using K2 20bit technology. A 20th Anniversary Edition was issued in Super Audio CD on 26 July 2005 (becoming the 3000th title for the SACD format), it featured a 5.1 surround sound remix done by Chuck Ainlay at British Grove Studios, it was mastered by Bob Ludwig at Gateway Mastering. The 5.1 mix was also released on DualDisc format with DVD-Audio 24 bit/96 kHz track on 16 August 2005. Ainlay's 5.1 remix won a Grammy for Best Surround Sound Album at the 48th Grammy Awards ceremony. In 2006, a half-speed-mastered vinyl version of the album was issued. Mastered by Stan Ricker, this version consists of four sides on two 33 1/3 rpm discs, containing the full-length songs on vinyl for the first time. In 2013, Mobile Fidelity Sound Lab released a hybrid SACD mastered from the original tapes by Shawn R. Britton, it includes the original stereo mix only. In 2014, a new master was released in Japan on SHM-SACD - it's made from the original analogue master tapes and contains the original LP length of the album: 47:44 min, this edition was transferred by Mick McKenna and Richard Whittaker at FX Copyroom using Direct Stream Digital. On May 19, 2014, Vertigo reissued the album on double 180g vinyl, this edition contains the full-length songs of the album, it was mastered by Bob Ludwig, Bernie Grundman and Chris Bellman from the original analogue and digital tapes, this version was also included on The Studio Albums 1978 - 1991 the previous year. In 2015, Mobile Fidelity also released the album on double 45 RPM vinyl, this edition was mastered by Krieg Wunderlich. The same year, the album re-entered the UK Album Charts at #8 following the record being made available at a discounted price on digital music retailers. In March 2021, a new half-speed mastered edition was released, mastered at Abbey Road Studios by Miles Showell. The release was a double-LP, 45 rpm, 180 gram edition, with the complete version of the album, for only the second time (the first being issued by Mobile Fidelity Sound Lab in 2015). The album has spent a total of 356 weeks on the UK Album Charts.

Critical reception

Initial reviews of Brothers in Arms from the UK music press in 1985 were generally negative. In a scathing review for NME, Mat Snow criticised Knopfler's "mawkish self-pity, his lugubriously mannered appropriation of rockin' Americana, his thumpingly crass attempts at wit". He also accused the album of the "tritest would-be melodies in history, the last word in tranquilising chord changes, the most cloying lonesome playing and ultimate in transparently fake troubador sentiment ever to ooze out of a million-dollar recording studio". Eleanor Levy of Record Mirror dismissed the "West Coast guitars reeking of mega bucks and sell out stadium concerts throughout the globe. Laid back melodies. Dire Straits – summed up... This is like any other Dire Straits album quarried out of the tottering edifice of MOR rock."

The reviews from other UK music papers were less harsh, with Jack Barron of Sounds feeling that "it's only a halfway decent album because it has only halfway decent songs... Knopfler has distilled his sonic essence, via blues, to appeal to billboard romantics with cinemascope insecurities. And he can pull it off well... but not often enough here." Melody Makers Barry McIlheney observed that Knopfler had recently explored different creative directions with his work on movie soundtracks and on Bob Dylan's Infidels, and bemoaned that "this admirable spirit of adventure fails to materialise... Instead it sounds just a bit too like the last Dire Straits album, which sounded not unlike the last one before that, which sounded suspiciously like the beginning of a hugely successful and very lucrative plan to take over the world known as AOR". He concluded, "the old rockschool restraints and the undeniably attractive smell of the winning formula seem to block out any such experimental work and what you end up with is something very like the same old story."

US reviews were more positive. Writing for Spin magazine, E. Brooks praised Knopfler's guitar work and noted that "when the intensity of his words approaches that of his ravishing stratocaster licks, the song soars. That doesn't happen as often as I'd like on this new album [...] but I find myself returning to certain cuts the way one might come back to a favorite chair." Brooks singled out the "haunting ballad" "Your Latest Trick", the "acerbic satire of vid-rock culture" in "Money for Nothing" and the "outstanding craftsmanship in the words and music" of the title track, which was "not a new message, but at least something other than sex, cars, or drugs is being talked about here. Take that and the quality of the musicianship, and you've got a lot." Debby Bull gave the album a mixed review for Rolling Stone magazine, praising the "carefully crafted" effort, writing, "The record is beautifully produced, with Mark Knopfler's terrific guitar work catching the best light". Although she found the lyrics literate, Bull noted that the scenarios "aren't as interesting as they used to be on records like Making Movies". Despite the production values and notable contributions from guest artists like drummer Omar Hakim and the Brecker Brothers, Bull concluded that "the music lacks the ache that made Knopfler's recent soundtracks for Comfort and Joy and Cal so powerful." In Rolling Stones end-of-year round-up of 1985's key albums, Fred Schruers said that "Knopfler's nimble, evocative guitar style and gentle vocalizing are still as appealing as they were on previous scenario-rich albums".

Later reviews have praised the record. Reviewing the remastered Dire Straits albums in 1996, Rob Beattie of Q awarded Brothers in Arms five stars out of five and wrote that "repeated listening reveals it as a singularly melancholic collection – see the guitar slashing of 'The Man's Too Strong' and the title track, where joy is as sharp as sorrow". In a 2007 review for BBC Music, Chris Jones called Brothers in Arms "a phenomenon on every level... a suite of Knopfler's very fine brand of JJ Cale-lite". In his retrospective review for AllMusic, Stephen Thomas Erlewine gave the album four out of five stars, crediting the international success of the album not only to the clever computer-animated video for "Money for Nothing", but also to Knopfler's "increased sense of pop songcraft". According to Erlewine, Dire Straits had "never been so concise or pop-oriented, and it wore well on them". Erlewine concluded that the album remains "one of their most focused and accomplished albums, and in its succinct pop sense, it's distinctive within their catalog".

In 2010, when Brothers in Arms was among ten albums nominated for the best British album of the past 30 years by the Brit Awards, music broadcaster and author Paul Gambaccini described the list of nominees as "risible" but added, "Brothers in Arms runs away with it for the quality of songwriting and musicianship."

Accolades
In 1986 Brothers in Arms won a Grammy Award for Best Engineered Album, Non-Classical, while the 20th Anniversary Edition won another Grammy in 2006 for Best Surround Sound Album, and also won Best British Album at the 1987 Brit Awards. In 2000, Q magazine placed the album at number 51 in its list of the 100 Greatest British Albums Ever. In 2003, the album ranked number 351 on Rolling Stone magazine's list of the "500 Greatest Albums of All Time", and number 352 in a 2012 revised list, and number 418 in the 2020 revision. The album was also included in the book 1001 Albums You Must Hear Before You Die.

In November 2006 the results of a national poll conducted by the public of Australia revealed their top 100 favourite albums. Brothers in Arms came in at number 64 (see "My Favourite Album"). Brothers in Arms is ranked number three in the best albums of 1985 and number 31 in the best albums of the 1980s.

As of July 2016 Brothers in Arms is the eighth-best-selling album of all-time in the UK. It is also the third-best-selling album of all-time in Australia, and the 18th-best-selling album of all-time in France. In the Netherlands, the album used to hold the record for longest run ever on the Dutch Album chart with 269 weeks (non-consecutive) but lost it to Adele's 21 in 2016.

British music journalist Robert Sandall wrote:

Awards and nominations

Track listings
All songs were written by Mark Knopfler, except where indicated.
The CD and cassette versions feature extended versions of "So Far Away", "Money for Nothing", "Your Latest Trick" and "Why Worry". Because of this, the Side Two of the cassette version has about 10 minutes of blank tape.

Single LP track listing

Double LP track listing

The Double LP edition uses extended versions of four songs originally featured on CD and cassette editions.

Personnel 
Credits adapted from album liner notes.

Dire Straits
 Mark Knopfler – guitars, vocals
 John Illsley – bass, vocals
 Alan Clark – keyboards
 Guy Fletcher – keyboards, vocals
 Omar Hakim – drums
 Terry Williams – drum intro on "Money for Nothing"

Additional musicians
Nature of contributions uncredited on album; contributions added where known.
 Michael Brecker – saxophone on "Your Latest Trick"
 Randy Brecker
 Malcolm Duncan
 Neil Jason – bass on "One World"
 Tony Levin – Chapman Stick on "Why Worry"
 Jimmy Maelen
 Mike Mainieri
 Dave Plews
 Jack Sonni
 Sting – vocals on "Money for Nothing"

Production 
 Mark Knopfler – producer 
 Neil Dorfsman – producer, engineer, mixing
 Dave Greenberg – assistant engineer 
 Steve Jackson – assistant engineer 
 Bruce Lampcov – assistant engineer 
 Bob Ludwig – mastering at Masterdisk (New York City, New York, USA) 
 John Dent – mastering at The Sound Clinic (London, UK) 
 Thomas Steyer – cover painting 
 Sutton Cooper – sleeve design 
 Deborah Feingold – photography

Charts
 In the Netherlands, the album broke the all-time record for most weeks on chart, with 269 non-consecutive weeks (since overtaken by Adele's 21 and the Buena Vista Social Club's eponymous debut album).
 In the UK, the album spent 14 weeks at number one on the UK Albums Chart, and as of August 2018 has spent 271 weeks on the chart.
 In the United States, the album reached number one on the Billboard 200 and remained there for nine weeks.

Weekly charts

Year-end charts

Decade-end charts

Certifications and sales

See also
 List of best-selling albums
 List of best-selling albums in the United Kingdom
 List of best-selling albums in Australia
 List of best-selling albums in Austria
 List of best-selling albums in France
 List of best-selling albums in New Zealand

References

Bibliography

External links
 Brothers in Arms at Mark Knopfler's website

1985 albums
Dire Straits albums
Albums produced by Mark Knopfler
Vertigo Records albums
Warner Records albums
Grammy Award-winning albums
Grammy Award for Best Immersive Audio Album
Grammy Award for Best Engineered Album, Non-Classical
APRA Award winners
Juno Award for International Album of the Year albums
Brit Award for British Album of the Year
Albums recorded at AIR Studios